"Harvest Moon" is a song written by Neil Young, and was released as the first single from his 1992 album Harvest Moon. It reached No. 36 on the UK Singles Chart.

Background and composition
The song uses a moon motif, which Young has mentioned as being very important to him and having quasi-religious undertones. It is a tribute to his wife Pegi Young, and the two are dancing in a bar in the music video. Linda Ronstadt provides the backing vocals. The song is composed in the key of D Major, with Young's vocal range spanning from D3 to F#4.

Reception
Rolling Stone ranked "Harvest Moon" in 2014 as the 37th-best Neil Young song of all time. AllMusic's Matthew Greenwald strongly praised the song, stating that the song epitomized the album and "the power of nature and music, as well as a feeling of celebrating lifetime love are the focal points here, and Young captures it all in his typically literate, artless style." Greenwald praised the melody as "positively gorgeous, and it's one that could have easily framed a heavier song." "Classic Rock Review" called it an "absolute masterpiece of a title song" that "celebrates longevity in relationships and love affairs with a flawless melody backed by a perfect music arrangement." They went on to say that "from the upfront acoustic riffing to the picked steel guitar, subtleties of ethereal sounds, soft brush strokes on the drums, and beautiful background vocals, this song captures the essence of beauty and romance as well any song ever."

Pitchfork said, "Young lets his guitar summon a vast distance—detuning the lowest string and letting it reverberate through the central riff, fingerpicking the harmonics high up the fretboard during the verses. The sound itself seems to conjure eternity, and the words do, too."

Charts

Weekly charts

Year-end charts

Certifications

References

External links
 

Neil Young songs
Songs written by Neil Young
1992 songs
1993 singles
Music videos directed by Julien Temple
Song recordings produced by Neil Young